Yenikənd (known as Qırmızı Oktyabr until 2001) is a village in the Ismayilli Rayon of Azerbaijan. The village forms part of the municipality of Kəlbənd.

References 

Populated places in Ismayilli District